Gymnasura flavia is a moth of the subfamily Arctiinae. It was described by George Hampson in 1900. It is found on New Guinea and in Queensland, Australia.

References

 

Nudariina
Moths described in 1900
Moths of New Guinea
Moths of Australia